Perittia granadensis is a moth of the family Elachistidae. It is found in Spain.

References

External links
lepiforum.de

Moths described in 1995
Elachistidae
Moths of Europe